This page is a list of diplomatic missions of Kosovo. Kosovo maintains 33 embassies abroad. Since Kosovo's declaration of independence, it has been recognised by 112 UN member states, as well as the  Sovereign Military Order of Malta, the Cook Islands and Niue.

Africa

Dakar (Embassy)

Americas

Ottawa (Embassy)
Toronto (Consulate General)

Panama City (Embassy)

Washington, D.C. (Embassy)
Des Moines (Consulate General)
New York (Consulate General)

Asia
 
 Dhaka (Embassy)

 West Jerusalem (Embassy)

Tokyo (Embassy)
 
 Doha (Embassy)

Riyadh (Embassy)
 
 Bangkok (Embassy)

Ankara (Embassy)
Istanbul (Consulate General)
 
 Abu Dhabi (Embassy)

Europe

Tirana (Embassy)

Vienna (Embassy)

Brussels (Embassy)

Sofia (Embassy)

Zagreb (Embassy)

Prague (Embassy)

Copenhagen (Consulate)

Paris (Embassy)
Strasbourg (Consulate General)

Berlin (Embassy)
Düsseldorf (Consulate General)
Munich (Consulate General)
Frankfurt am Main (Consulate)
Stuttgart (Consulate)

Budapest (Embassy)

Rome (Embassy)
Milan (Consulate General)
Bari (Consular Office)

 Podgorica (Embassy)

The Hague (Embassy)

Skopje (Embassy)
Struga (Consulate General)

Oslo (Embassy)
 
Lisbon (Embassy) 
 
 Belgrade (Liaison office)

Ljubljana (Embassy)

Stockholm (Embassy)

Bern (Embassy)
Geneva (Consulate General)
Zurich (Consulate)

London (Embassy)

Oceania

Canberra (Embassy)

Embassies to open
 
 Bogotá (Embassy) (to open)

 Dodoma (Embassy) (to open)
 
 Warsaw (Embassy) (to open)
 
 Bratislava (Liaison Office) (to open)

Non-resident accredited embassies

 (Paris)
 (Riyadh)
 (Panama City)
 (Dakar)
 (Canberra)
 (Panama City)
 (Berlin)
 (Brussels)
 (Tokyo)
 (Canberra)
 (Stockholm)
 (Dakar)
 (Panama City)
 (Stockholm)
 (London)
 (Ankara)
 (Stockholm)
 (Dakar)
 (Bern)
 (Stockholm)
 (Brussels)
 (Riyadh)
 (Rome)
 (Tokyo)
 (Paris)
 (Canberra)
 (Ankara)
 (Panama City)
 (Panama City)
 (Canberra)
 (Rome)
 (Canberra)
 (Canberra)
 (Tokyo)
 (Canberra)

See also
 List of diplomatic missions in Kosovo
 Foreign relations of Kosovo

Notes

References

External links
Ministry of Foreign Affairs, Republic of Kosovo
Kosovo missions abroad

Kosovo
Diplomatic missions
Diplomatic missions
Diplomatic missions